In mathematics, and in particular differential geometry and gauge theory, Hitchin's equations are a system of partial differential equations for a connection and Higgs field on a vector bundle or principal bundle over a Riemann surface, written down by Nigel Hitchin in 1987. Hitchin's equations are locally equivalent to the harmonic map equation for a surface into the symmetric space dual to the structure group. They also appear as a dimensional reduction of the self-dual Yang–Mills equations from four dimensions to two dimensions, and solutions to Hitchin's equations give examples of Higgs bundles and of holomorphic connections. The existence of solutions to Hitchin's equations on a compact Riemann surface follows from the stability of the corresponding Higgs bundle or the corresponding holomorphic connection, and this is the simplest form of the Nonabelian Hodge correspondence.

The moduli space of solutions to Hitchin's equations was constructed by Hitchin in the rank two case on a compact Riemann surface and was one of the first examples of a hyperkähler manifold constructed. 
The nonabelian Hodge correspondence shows it is isomorphic to the Higgs bundle moduli space, and to the moduli space of holomorphic connections.
Using the metric structure on the Higgs bundle moduli space afforded by its description in terms of Hitchin's equations, Hitchin constructed the Hitchin system, a completely integrable system whose twisted generalization over a finite field was used by Ngô Bảo Châu in his proof of the fundamental lemma in the Langlands program, for which he was afforded the 2010 Fields medal.

Definition 

The definition may be phrased for a connection on a vector bundle or principal bundle, with the two perspectives being essentially interchangeable. Here the definition of principal bundles is presented, which is the form that appears in Hitchin's work.

Let  be a principal -bundle for a compact real Lie group  over a compact Riemann surface.

For a pair , Hitchin's equations assert that

Since  is of type , Hitchin's equations assert that the -component . A pair consisting of a holomorphic vector bundle  with a holomorphic endomorphism-valued -form  is called a Higgs bundle, and so every solution to Hitchin's equations produces an example of a Higgs bundle.

Derivation 

Hitchin's equations can be derived as a dimensional reduction of the Yang–Mills equations from four dimension to two dimensions. Then there exists four functions  such that 

The self-duality equations for the connection , a particular case of the Yang–Mills equations, can be written 

References 

Differential geometry